Tyrannosaurus rex is a species of dinosaur.

T. Rex or T-Rex may also refer to:

Biology
 Tachyoryctes rex, the king mole rat, a rodent species found high on Mount Kenya
 Thoristella rex, a sea snail species endemic to New Zealand
 Trialeurodes rex, a whitefly species found on Sulawesi
 Tropidoptera rex, a probably extinct snail species endemic to Oahu
 Tyrannasorus rex, a fossil beetle species from the Miocene epoch
 Tyrannobdella rex, a leech species found in South America
 Tyrannochthonius rex, a pseudoscorpion species found in Australia
 Tyrannomolpus rex, a leaf beetle species endemic to New Zealand
 Tyrannomyrmex rex, an ant species found in Southeast Asia

Arts, entertainment, and media

Music

Groups and labels
 T. Rex (band), a 1970s glam rock band (previously Tyrannosaurus Rex. a 1960s psychedelic folk duo) headed by Marc Bolan
 Mickey Finn's T-Rex, a tribute band to the 1970s glam rock band, formed by members of the original band
 X-T. Rex, formerly Bill Legend's T.Rex, another tribute band to the 1970s glam rock band, formed by Bill Legend, another member of the original band  
 T.Rex Wax Company, record label owned by Marc Bolan which released his band's recordings from 1972 onwards

Other uses in music
 T. Rex (album), a 1970 studio album by the 1970s band
 "T-Rex [Jurassic Park]", a song by Basshunter from The Old Shit album

Other uses in arts, entertainment, and media
 T-Rex, the main character of Dinosaur Comics
 The Adventures of T-Rex, an American animated television series
 Theodore Rex (film), starring Whoopi Goldberg
 T-Rex, a toy in Big & Small

Brands and enterprises
 .577 T-Rex, .577 Tyrannosaur, a very large and powerful rifle cartridge developed for "stopping rifles" intended to stop the charge of dangerous game
 T-Rex Engineering, a guitar effect pedal manufacturer

Sports teams
 dmedia T-REX, a defunct Chinese Professional Baseball League team
 Tupelo T-Rex, a defunct American ice hockey team

Vehicles
 Bremach T-Rex, a multi-purpose truck manufactured in Italy
 Campagna T-Rex, a two-seat, three-wheeled vehicle manufactured in Canada
 Dodge T-Rex, a 6x6 concept vehicle
 T-Rex, a Ukrainian main battle tank in development

Other uses
 T-Rex Cafe, a restaurant chain at Disney Springs in Lake Buena Vista, Florida
 T-REX (web server), developed at the Université du Québec à Montréal, Canada
 T-REX Project, a Colorado Department of Transportation project
 T-REx cell lines, a proprietary cell line system using tetracycline-controlled transcriptional activation

See also
 Terex, a construction equipment manufacturer
 Trex (disambiguation)

Species Latin name abbreviation disambiguation pages